Segal, and its variants including Segel or Siegel, is a primarily an Ashkenazi Jewish family name.

It may also refer to:

 Segal, a consulting firm in the USA and Canada
 Segal Lock and Hardware Company, a hardware manufacturer of Manhattan, USA
 Saint-Ségal, a commune in the Finistère department of Brittany in north-western France
 SEGAL, Société Européenne de Galvanisation, steel products company, part of Tata Steel Europe

See also
 Segal
 Segel
 Siegel
 Sigel (disambiguation)